The men's 4 × 100 metres relay event at the 2000 Asian Athletics Championships was held in Jakarta, Indonesia on 30–31 August.

Medalists

Results

Heats

Final

References

2000 Asian Athletics Championships
Relays at the Asian Athletics Championships